Wild date palm is a common name for several plants and may refer to:

Senegal data palm, Phoenix reclinata
Silver date palm, Phoenix sylvestris